Maytenus cymosa, also called Caribbean mayten, is a species of plant in the family Celastraceae. It is found in Puerto Rico, the British Virgin Islands, and the U.S. Virgin Islands.

References

cymosa
Trees of the Caribbean
Flora of Puerto Rico
Flora of the British Virgin Islands
Flora of the United States Virgin Islands
Endangered flora of North America
Endangered flora of the United States
Taxonomy articles created by Polbot